Lucas Matías Márquez (born 25 October 1988) is an Argentine professional footballer who plays as a defender for Mitre.

Career
Márquez began his senior footballing career in 2007, with Patronato in Torneo Argentino B. He made one hundred and eighty-eight appearances in his first nine seasons, as the club rose from Torneo Argentino B to the Argentine Primera División. In that spell, Márquez's professional debut arrived in October 2010 during a 1–0 Primera B Nacional victory over CAI while his first goal in professional football came in a defeat versus Deportivo Merlo on 28 April 2012. He made his Primera División bow in 2016 vs. Gimnasia y Esgrima (LP) at the Estadio Presbítero Bartolomé Grella. He left Patronato in 2018 to join Gimnasia y Esgrima (M).

Career statistics
.

Honours
Patronato
Torneo Argentino B: 2007–08
Torneo Argentino A: 2009–10

References

External links

1988 births
Living people
People from Paraná, Entre Ríos
Argentine footballers
Association football defenders
Torneo Argentino B players
Torneo Argentino A players
Primera Nacional players
Argentine Primera División players
Club Atlético Patronato footballers
Gimnasia y Esgrima de Mendoza footballers
Club Atlético Mitre footballers
Sportspeople from Entre Ríos Province